Jalal Dabagh (born 1939) is a Kurdish politician and writer/journalist.

Life 
Jalal Dabagh was born on May 12, 1939, in Silêmanî city in south Kurdistan. He is one of nine children, five sons and four daughters.

Education and Profession 
He received his compulsory- and senior high school education in Silêmanî, where he also went on study at a teachers' training college.

In 1959 Dabagh started working as a teacher at a compulsory school in Silêmanî. Thereafter, in 1962, he went to Romania for three years studying social science at Bucharest Institute of Social Science.

He advanced his social science studies in Moscow (USSR) between 1974 and 1976.

Between 1970-77 he was one of the board members of the Kurdish Writers Union, for which he was the administrative secretary 1970-74.

As one of the Kurdish representatives he attended the 5th conference of Afro-Asian Writers’ Union 4–9 September 1973 in Alma-Ata, Kazakhstan (then one of the republics of USSR).

Dabagh is fluent in Kurdish and Arabic, he speaks or understands conversational Swedish, English, Romanian and Persian.

In addition, Jalal Dabagh worked as a journalist for over 25 years.

Current affairs 

Jalal Dabagh was the party leader for the Left Party in the Kurdistan region of Iraq (south Kurdistan) 

Was a candidate for the Iraqi parliament in 2010.

Dabagh was a member of The Association for Pêşmerge Dêrînekan of Kurdistan, which is an association for the veteran Kurdish fighters. The purpose of the association is to preserve the rights of former fighters and also function as a forum for discussing the present and the future of Kurdistan.

He is also working on a biography about himself.

Commitment 
Dabagh was deputy editor of the weekly magazine Bîrî Nwê (New Idea), 1972–1978. Bîrî Nwê was published in Baghdad, both in Kurdish and Arabic, a magazine dealing with culture, politics and society. It had a major role in spreading progressive literature and culture.

Between 1986 and 1991 Dabagh was chief editor for the Kurdish edition of Problems of Peace and Socialism—in Kurdish, named Regay Aşti û Sosyalîzm.

Moreover, he was the editor of Govarî Bîrî Nwê, a monthly magazine.

Work 
Jalal Dabagh has written and translated numerous books.

Translated 

The Communist Manifesto
Dabagh made the first Kurdish translation of The Communist Manifesto, one of the world's most influential political manuscripts.
Published in: 1996 and 2001

Raparini Kurdan 1925
Dabagh translated Manvel Arsenovic Gasratjan's Kurdy Turcsii v novejsee vremja (Kurdish: Raparini Kurdan 1925) to Kurdish. Raparini Kurdan 1925 is about the 1925 Sheikh Said rebellion, led by Sheikh Said.
Published in: 2006

Karma
He has also translated Diagnostics of Karma to Kurdish. written by Sergey N. Lazarev. Which educates about alternative therapies with karma in focus.
Published in: 2006

Wa Bahar Hat
A novel written by Haci Jindey, freely translated to "Now comes the Spring" was translated to Kurdish by Dabagh.

Pîawêkî Nabîn
Pîawêkî Nabîn (A Blind Man) is a manuscript originally written by Khalil Gibran

Tawawy Nusînakanî Fahd
Tawawy Nusînakanî Fahd is the collected works of Yusuf Salman Yusuf, also known merely as Fahd. It was translated to Kurdish by Jalal Dabagh.
Published in: 2001.

Other notable translations are Freedom Road, about the lives of former slaves during Reconstruction, and Marxism Philosophy and the first Kurdish translation of "The Internationale".

Written 

Hacî Qadirî Koyî
Hacî Kaderî Koyey, freely translated in English to Hajji Kader from Koye.
Published in: 2009.

Goranî Serkawtin
Freely translated to Songs of Victory is a collection of poems.
Published in: 1998.

28 Estêre le Asmanî Nemrîda
Freely translated to 28 Stars in the Sky of the Immortal.
Published in: 1985.

La Dafterî Geshtekî Regay Jîanewe
Freely translated to Diary from Road of Life.
Published in: 1978.

Jîan û Tekoşanî Dîmitrov
Freely translated to Life and Struggle of Dimitrov is about the Bulgarian Communist leader Georgi Dimitrov.
Published in: 1973.

References

External links
Official Facebook Page
 
 

1939 births
Iraqi Kurdish people
Kurdish journalists
Living people
Kurdistan Toilers' Party politicians
Iraqi Kurdistani politicians